Alexander Cullen may refer to:

 Alexander Lamb Cullen (1920–2013), British electrical engineer
 Alexander Cullen (architect) (1892–1963), Scottish architect and town planner